The fifth season of Supernatural, an American dark fantasy television series created by Eric Kripke, premiered September 10, 2009, and concluded on May 13, 2010, on The CW. Season five regular cast members include Jared Padalecki, Jensen Ackles and Misha Collins, who was promoted to series regular this season. After the conclusion of this season, series creator Eric Kripke stepped down as showrunner. The fifth season was released on DVD and Blu-ray in region 1 on September 7, 2010. The season follows Sam and Dean as they set out to take down Lucifer, whom Sam had inadvertently released from Hell at the end of the previous season.

Mark Pellegrino plays the role of Lucifer. Paris Hilton guest stars in the episode "Fallen Idols", in which she plays Leshi, a god that takes the form of various well-known faces including herself. The season also features the return of Jo and her mother Ellen Harvelle, as well as hunter Rufus Turner, the Trickster and the prophet Chuck Shurley.

Cast

Starring
 Jared Padalecki as Sam Winchester / Lucifer
 Jensen Ackles as Dean Winchester
 Misha Collins as Castiel

Special guest star
 Paris Hilton as Herself / Leshi

Guest stars

Episodes

In this table, the number in the first column refers to the episode's number within the entire series, whereas the number in the second column indicates the episode's number within that particular season. "U.S. viewers in millions" refers to how many Americans who watched the episode live or on the day of broadcast.

Reception
The fifth season received critical acclaim, and is widely regarded as one of the show's best seasons. The review aggregator website Rotten Tomatoes reported a 90% approval rating for Supernatural'''s fifth season, with an average rating of 7.83/10 based on 10 reviews. The critics consensus reads, "Supernatural'' continues to benefit from its charismatic leads and a solid script, creating a story that is almost supernaturally addictive."

Controversy
The episode "Hammer of the Gods" was controversial among Indian and Hindu audiences, as it depicted Kali and Ganesh in a negative light.

Notes

References

External links 

 
 
 

Supernatural 05
2009 American television seasons
2010 American television seasons
Hinduism in pop culture-related controversies